Itumeleng Sekwale (born 5 January 1983) is a South African soccer player.

He has played for Supersport United, Moroka Swallows, Jomo Cosmos and Thanda Royal Zulu as a midfielder. He has one cap for the South Africa Under-23s side.

Playing career
Supersport United
Moroka Swallows
Jomo Cosmos (2004–present)

References

1983 births
Living people
Association football midfielders
South African soccer players
Thanda Royal Zulu F.C. players